Cladodoides is a genus of extinct shark. It appeared in the Frasnian stage of the late Devonian.

It has a well-described braincase and brain cavity, and has greatly informed our understanding of the skull, brain, nerves, and jaws of early sharks. Cladodoides is likely a cladodont shark. Remains have been found in Germany.

References

Devonian sharks
Devonian fish of North America
Prehistoric shark genera